was a town located in Taka District, Hyōgo Prefecture, Japan.

As of 2003, the town had an estimated population of 6,262 and a population density of 118.00 persons per km². The total area was 53.07 km².

On November 1, 2005, Yachiyo, along with the towns of Kami and Naka (all from Taka District), was merged to create the town of Taka.

External links
  

Dissolved municipalities of Hyōgo Prefecture
Taka, Hyōgo